Vivasaayi Magan is a 1997 Indian Tamil-language drama film, written and directed by Ramarajan. The film stars him, Devayani, K. R. Vijaya and Vadivelu. It was released on 6 March 1997.

Plot

Cast 

Ramarajan as Kathirvel
Devayani as Jyothi
K. R. Vijaya as Kathirvel and Veeramuthu's mother
Rajeev as Veeramuthu
Veera
Vadivelu
Jayashree as Veeramuthu's wife
Junior Balaiah
Santhana Bharathi
Gandhimathi
Anuja
S. N. Parvathy
Thaarini
Mahima
Vasuki
Oru Viral Krishna Rao
 Halwa Vasu
Madhan Bob

Soundtrack 
The music was composed by Sirpy.

Reception 
R.P.R. of Kalki felt Ramarajan wrote the screenplay within one night and advised him either to act or direct, not to handle both departments and mess it up.

References

External links 
 

1990s Tamil-language films
1997 drama films
1997 films
Films directed by Ramarajan
Films scored by Sirpy
Indian drama films